The 2004 CAA men's basketball tournament was held March 5–8, 2004, at the Richmond Coliseum in Richmond, Virginia. The winner of the tournament was VCU, who received an automatic bid to the 2004 NCAA Men's Division I Basketball Tournament.

Bracket

Honors

References

-2004 CAA men's basketball tournament
Colonial Athletic Association men's basketball tournament
CAA men's basketball tournament
CAA men's basketball tournament
Sports competitions in Virginia
Basketball in Virginia